The 1995–96 NBA season was the Bucks' 28th season in the National Basketball Association. During the off-season, the Bucks re-signed free agent and former Bucks forward Terry Cummings, and acquired former All-Star center Kevin Duckworth from the Washington Bullets. Early into the season, the team traded Todd Day and Alton Lister to the Boston Celtics in exchange for Sherman Douglas, and dealt Eric Murdock and second-year forward Eric Mobley to the expansion Vancouver Grizzlies in exchange for Benoit Benjamin. The Bucks, led by developing superstars Vin Baker and second-year forward Glenn Robinson, were considered a team with playoff potential. However, the team continued to underachive holding an 18–27 record at the All-Star break. After holding a 21–35 record as of March 2, and with Duckworth only playing just eight games due to a knee injury sustained during the preseason, the team suffered a dreadful 15-game losing streak in March. The Bucks missed the playoffs for the fifth straight season, finishing seventh in the Central Division with a disappointing 25–57 record.

Baker averaged 21.1 points and 9.9 rebounds per game, and was selected for the 1996 NBA All-Star Game, while Robinson averaged 20.2 points and 6.1 rebounds per game, and Douglas provided the team with 11.5 points and 5.8 assists per game. In addition, Johnny Newman contributed 10.8 points per game, while Cummings provided with 8.0 points and 5.5 rebounds per game off the bench, and Benjamin averaged 7.8 points and 6.2 rebounds per game. 

Following the season, head coach Mike Dunleavy was fired, but he would later on return to coach to the Portland Trail Blazers after a one-year absence from coaching, while Cummings signed as a free agent with the Seattle SuperSonics midway through the following season, Duckworth signed with the Los Angeles Clippers, Lee Mayberry signed with the Vancouver Grizzlies, Marty Conlon signed with the Boston Celtics, and Benjamin signed with the Toronto Raptors.

For the season, the Bucks added new dark green alternate road uniforms, which showed a buck in purple and silver colors on the front of their jerseys. These uniforms remained in use until 1999.

Draft picks

Roster

Regular season

Season standings

z - clinched division title
y - clinched division title
x - clinched playoff spot

Record vs. opponents

Game log

|-style="background:#bbffbb;"
| 1 || November 3, 1995 || @ Boston
| W 101–100
|
|
|
| FleetCenter16,321
| 1–0
|-style="background:#fcc;"
| 2 || November 4, 1995 || New York
| L 71–84
|
|
|
| Bradley Center18,633
| 1–1
|-style="background:#fcc;"
| 3 || November 7, 1995 || @ Houston
| L 89–106
|Vin Baker (21)
|
|
| The Summit15,095
| 1–2
|-style="background:#fcc;"
| 4 || November 9, 1995 || @ Dallas
| L 94–104
|
|
|
| Reunion Arena15,095
| 1–3
|-style="background:#bbffbb;"
| 6 || November 14, 1995 || San Antonio
| W 98–84
|
|
|
| Bradley Center13,464
| 2–4
|-style="background:#bbffbb;"
| 9 || November 22, 1995 || Toronto
| W 96–86
|
|
|
| Bradley Center14,959
| 3–6

|-style="background:#fcc;"
| 14 || December 1, 1995 || @ Seattle
| L 99–110
|
|
|
| KeyArena17,072
| 4–10
|-style="background:#fcc;"
| 17 || December 9, 1995 || Chicago
| L 106–118
|
|
|
| Bradley Center18,633
| 6–11
|-style="background:#bbffbb;"
| 24 || December 23, 1995 || Atlanta
| W 96–86
|
|
|
| Bradley Center15,658
| 9–15

|-style="background:#bbffbb;"
| 42 || February 1, 1996 || Denver
| W 108–102
|
|
|
| Bradley Center13,389
| 16–26
|-style="background:#fcc;"
| 43 || February 3, 1996 || Cleveland
| L 88–111
|
|
|
| Bradley Center17,979
| 16–27
|-style="background:#bbffbb;"
| 44 || February 6, 1996 || Dallas
| W 114–111
|
|
|
| Bradley Center13,854
| 17–27

|-style="background:#fcc;"
| 79 || April 16, 1996 || Chicago
| L 80–86
|
|
|
| Bradley Center18,633
| 24–55

Player statistics

Awards and records

Transactions

Overview

Trades

Free agents

Player Transactions Citation:

References

See also
 1995-96 NBA season

Milwaukee Bucks seasons
Milwaukee Bucks
Milwaukee Bucks
Milwaukee